Section Officer may refer to: 
Section Officer is an initial level of officer in government offices. The person who holds this profession is the in charge of a section, branch, or sub branch.

Section Officer may refer to: 

 
The equivalent rank to Flying officer in the British Women's Auxiliary Air Force
The equivalent rank to Sergeant in some British Special Constabularies